Crusher is the name of three supervillains appearing in American comic books published by Marvel Comics.

Publication history
The first Crusher first appeared in Thor #130 and was created by Stan Lee and Jack Kirby.

The second Crusher first appeared in Tales of Suspense #91 (July 1967), and was created by Stan Lee and Gene Colan. The character died in his second appearance in Iron Man #6 and his body later appeared in Daredevil #119 (March 1975).

The third Crusher first appeared in Daredevil #119 (March 1975), and was created by Tony Isabella and Bob Brown. The character died in the same issue.

Fictional character biography

Servant of Pluto

In an effort to free Hercules from Pluto's thrawl, Thor fought his way through the forces of Pluto. Pluto sent Crusher to fight against Thor. As no opponent had broken free from Crusher's grasp before, Thor was the first to do so and sent Crusher flying. Pluto released Hercules from his thrall to prevent Thor from shattering the Greek underworld.

Caldwell Rozza

Caldwell Rozza is a Cuban scientist in South America who has created a formula that would make the President of his country the "master of the world." The President didn't trust him and had him test it on himself by injecting it (which is what the scientist anticipated). The formula caused the scientist to grow in size and strength in front of the President's eyes. Thus, the scientist became Crusher, a giant, rock-hard, immensely heavy menace. None of the President's weapons could pierce the Crusher. The President knew he would make a great asset to his army and told Crusher to kill Iron Man as a way of becoming a general in his army. Crusher went to America and attacked Stark Industries. This attracted Iron Man and both of them fought in battle. Iron Man used the Centrifugal Ray on Crusher causing him to fall through the floor. He subsequently fell underground somewhere.

Crusher eventually landed in Subterranea where the formula that gave him his powers wore off. While exploring Subterranea, he stumbled upon Tyrannus' abandoned base and used the materials there to recreate the Crusher formula. After it was complete, Crusher began to dig his way up to the surface to get revenge on Iron Man. After making his way to the surface, Crusher found the men that smuggled him into America and forced them to help him to Stark Industries. He fought Iron Man and took Whitney Frost hostage to force Iron Man to hand over the Centrifugal Ray to him. Crusher's fingers were too big for him to operate the controls in his revenge against Iron Man causing it to accidentally overload. Iron Man then took the opportunity to tackle Crusher and carried him to the ocean in an attempt to knock him out utilizing the thin atmosphere of lower orbit, but Crusher's attempts to break free caused Iron Man to lose his grip, knocking Crusher into the waters below. Crusher was so heavy that he sank to the bottom of the ocean and drowned.

Juan Aponte

A coroner named Dr. Jakkelburr received the Crusher's body and studied it in hopes to recreate the formula. Dr. Jakkelburr's formula recreation was a success when he gave it to a bantamweight boxer named Juan Aponte (who wanted to become a heavyweight boxer). Juan began to take the formula, but it had a side-effect that gave him mood swings and violent fits of temper. Former boxer Father Gawaine and Coach Pop Fenton both wanted to help Juan and enlisted the help of Matt Murdock. However, Dr. Jakkelburr sent men to rough up the three of them. Murdock managed to slip away to become Daredevil. The effects of the formula finally overwhelmed Juan causing him to transform into a mindless version of the Crusher. Crusher fought Daredevil and tore up Fogwell's gym in the fight. When he accidentally caused a wall to topple toward Father Gawaine and Pop Fenton, Crusher dove to their rescue and was crushed by the falling wall. Juan reverted to normal and died in his coach's arms.

Powers and abilities
Crusher I has superhuman strength and is immune to diseases.

Crusher II and Crusher III have superhuman strength, durable skin, and enhanced weight.

References

External links
 
 
 

Articles about multiple fictional characters
Characters created by Bob Brown
Characters created by Gene Colan
Characters created by Jack Kirby
Characters created by Stan Lee
Characters created by Tony Isabella
Comics characters introduced in 1966
Comics characters introduced in 1967
Comics characters introduced in 1975
Fictional biochemists
Fictional boxers
Fictional Cuban people
Marvel Comics characters with superhuman strength
Marvel Comics male supervillains
Marvel Comics martial artists
Marvel Comics scientists